Atkins is an unincorporated community in Bossier Parish, Louisiana, United States.

Unincorporated communities in Louisiana
Unincorporated communities in Bossier Parish, Louisiana
Unincorporated communities in Shreveport – Bossier City metropolitan area